This is the list of fashion weeks/events/shows held annually or two times a year all around the world. The "Big Four" events are the Paris Fashion Week, Milan Fashion Week, New York Fashion Week and London Fashion Week. Among the most popular fashion weeks is also Arab Fashion Week, Vancouver Fashion Week and Russia Fashion Week. While the fashion scene turns more multipolar in the 21st century, other centers like Berlin, Los Angeles, Madrid, Rome, São Paulo, Shanghai, Mumbai and Tokyo host important fashion weeks and other events.

The list is ordered by continent and country-wise.

Africa

Algeria 
 La Mode à Alger
 Algiers Fashion Week
 Oran Fashion Week

Botswana 
 Gaborone Fashion Weekend
 Masa Fashion Show
 Exclusive Fashion Week

Côte d'Ivoire 
 Cote d'Ivoire Fashion Week

Egypt 
 Cairo Fashion Festival
 Cairo Couture Collections
 Cairo Fashion Week
 La Mode A Beyrouth - Cairo

Ethiopia
 Hub of Africa! Fashion Week

Kenya 
 Nairobi Fashion Week

Malawi 
 Fashion Malawi Edition

Nigeria 
 African Fashion and Design Week
 Hayati Fashion Week
 Lagos Fashion Week
  Kwara Fashion Week
 Port Harcourt International Fashion Week
 AfrikQueen International

South Africa 
 South African Fashion Week
 AFI Fashion Week
 Soweto Fashion Week

Mozambique 
 Mozambique Fashion Week

America

Argentina
 Buenos Aires Fashion Week
 Cordoba Fashion Week
 Mendoza Fashion Week
 Santa Fe Fashion Week

Bolivia 
 Bolivia Fashion Week
 International Fashion Week Bolivia

Brazil 

 Minas Trend Preview
 Brasília Fashion Week
 Fortaleza Fashion Week
 Amazônia Fashion Week
 Rio Fashion Week
 Salvador de Bahia Black Fashion Week
 São Paulo Fashion Week

Canada 
 Fashion Cares
 Montréal Fashion and Design Festival
 Ottawa Fashion Week
 Toronto Fashion Week
 Vancouver Fashion Week
 Western Canada Fashion Week

Chile 
 Chile Fashion Week
 Elite Model Look Chile
 Santiago Fashion Week

Colombia 
 Bogota Fashion Week
 Barranquilla Fashion Week
 Cali Fashion Week
 Cali ExpoShow
 Cartagena Fashion
 ColombiaModa
 ColombiaTex
 Medellin Fashion Week
 Plataforma K

Dominican Republic 
 Dominicana Moda Fashion Week
 RD Bridal Fashion Week

Jamaica 
 Caribbean Fashion Week
 Style Week Jamaica
 Kingston Bridal Week

Mexico 
 Guadalajara Design Week
 Cancun Coture Week
 Mexico City Fashion Week
 MT Fashion Week (Monterrey)
 Puebla Fashion Show
Intermoda
Desfilia

Panama 
 Panama Fashion Week

Paraguay 
Asunción Fashion Week
Ciudad del Este Fashion Week
Encarnación Fashion Week

Peru 
 LIF Fashion Week (Lima)

Puerto Rico 
 Elite Model Look Puerto Rico
 Puerto Rico High Fashion Week
 San Juan Moda
 West Fashion Week
 South Fashion Week

United States 

Principal shows:

 Africa Fashion Week New York
 African Fashion Week Houston
 Atlantic City Fashion Week
 Boston Fashion Week
 Christian Fashion Week
 Fashion Week Cleveland
 Denver Fashion Week
 Houston Fashion Week
 Los Angeles Fashion Week
 Men's Fashion Week
 Men's Fashion Week Los Angeles
 Mercedes-Benz Fashion Week Miami
 Met Gala
 Miami Fashion Week
 New York Fashion Week (capital)
 Fall 2008 fashion weeks
 List of Fall 2008 New York Fashion Week fashion shows
 Men's Fashion Week
 Rip the Runway
 Pittsburgh Fashion Week
 The Retreat Miami
 Splendid Indian Closet Fashion Tour
 Spring 2008 New York Fashion Week
 Victoria's Secret Fashion Show

Uruguay 
 Montevideo Fashion Week

Venezuela 
 Caracas Fashion Week

Asia

Bahrain 
 Bahrain International Design Week

Bangladesh 
 Bangladesh Fashion Week
 Dhaka Fashion Week
 International Women's Day Show 2019 Chittagong

China 
 Centrestage
 China Fashion Week
 Elite Model Look International 2009
 Guangzhou Fashion Week
 Shanghai Fashion Week
 Shenzhen Fashion Week
 Tianjin Fashion Week

Hong Kong 
 Hong Kong Fashion Week for Fall/Winter

India 

 Vivz World Fashion Week
 Bangalore Fashion Week
 India Fashion Week
 India Runway Week
 Lakme Fashion Week
 India International Fashion Festival

Indonesia 

 Indonesia Fashion Week
 Jakarta Fashion Week 
 Plaza Indonesia's Men Fashion Week
 Surabaya Fashion Parade
 Bandung Fashion Week
 Citayam Fashion Week
 Jember Fashion Carnaval
 Bali Fashion Trend
 Jogja Fashion Week
 Jakarta Modest Fashion Week
 Jakarta Hijab Fashion Week
 Femme 
 Celebes Beauty Fashion Week
 Indonesia Fashion Parade

Iran 
 Iran Fashion Week
 Tehran Fashion Week

Israel 
 Tel Aviv Fashion Week (he)

Japan 

 Girls Award
 Hiroshima Fashion Week
 Kobe Collection
 Kyoto Fashion Week
 Nagoya Fashion Week
 Osaka Fashion Week
 Sapporo Fashion Week
 Tokyo Fashion week (ja)
 Tokyo Girls Collection

Malaysia 
 Kuala Lumpur Fashion Week
 Malaysian International Fashion Alliance (MIFA)
 Asia Islamic Fashion Week 2017 (AIFW 2017)
 Borneo Fashion Week

Mongolia 
 Goyol Fashion Festival
 Ocouture Fashion show

Nepal 
 Model Hunt Nepal
 Voyage of creation
 Nepal Fashion Week
 CHIC Fashion Show
 The Show

Pakistan 
 Pakistan Fashion Week
 Islamabad Fashion Week
 Karachi Fashion Week
 Lahore Fashion Week
 Peshawar Fashion Week
 PFDC Sunsilk Fashion Week
 Media Box Fashion Week

Philippines 
Philippine Fashion Week
Manila Fashion Festival
Mega Fashion Week
Stylefest Ph
Philippine Fashion Gala
Bench Fashion Week

Russia 
 Nizhny Fashion Week
 Novosibirsk Fashion Week
 Yekaterinburg Ural Fashion Week
 Russia Fashion Week
 Mercedes-Benz Fashion Week Russia
 St. Petersburg Fashion Week
 Volvo Moscow Fashion Week

Singapore 
 Asia Fashion Exchange
 Asia Style Collection
 Fide Fashion Weeks
 Men's Fashion Week
 Singapore Fashion Festival
 Singapore Fashion Week

South Korea 
 Miss Supertalent Seoul Fashion Week
 Seoul Fashion Week
 Preview in Daegu
 Busan Fashion Week
 Daegu Fashion Fair (Week)
 Seoul Girls Collection

Sri Lanka 
 Colombo Fashion Week

Taiwan 
 Taipei Fashion Week

Thailand 
 Bangkok International Fashion Week
 Elle Fashion Week

Turkey 
 Antalya Fashion Week
 Istanbul Fashion Week

United Arab Emirates 
Arab Fashion Week

Vietnam 
Vietnam International Fashion Week

Qatar 
 Doha Fashion Week

Europe

Austria 
 Vienna Fashion Week

Belarus 
 Belarus Fashion Week

Belgium 
 Antwerp Fashion Show
 Brussels Fashion Week

Bulgaria 
 Sofia Fashion Week Couture
 Kids Fashion Week
 Men's Fashion Week Plovdiv
 Plovdiv Fashion Week Prêt-à-Porter
 Bridal Fashion Week Plovdiv
 Dance Fashion Week Burgas
 Lingerie & Swimwear Fashion Week Varna

Czech Republic 
 Prague Fashion Week

Croatia 
 Zagreb Fashion Week

Denmark 
 Copenhagen Fashion Week
 Gallery Int Fashion Fair

Finland 
 Helsinki Fashion Week
 African Fashion Week Helsinki
 Afrofinn Fashion Helsinki

France 

 Africa Fashion Week Paris
 Bordeaux Fashion Week
 Elite Model Look
 Cannes-Nice Fashion Week
 Bal des débutantes
 Paris Fashion Week (capital)
 Fall 2008 fashion weeks
 Men's Fashion Week
 Lille Fashion Week
 Lyon Fashion Week (FashionCity Show)
 Marseille Fashion Week
 Miss Supertalent Paris Fashion Week
 Nantes Fashion Week
 Rennes Fashion Week
 Toulouse Fashion Week
 Strasbourg Fashion Week (EM Fashion Week)
 St. Tropez Fashion Week
 Spring 2004 Dior couture collection

Georgia 
 Adjara Fashion Week
 Mercedes-Benz Fashion Week Tbilisi
 Tbilisi Fashion Week

Germany 

 Baltic Fashion Week (Usedom Island)
 Berlin Fashion Week
 Bread and Butter tradeshow
 Stylenite by Michael Michalsky
 Düsseldorf Fashion Week
 Frankfurt Fashion Week
 Hamburg Fashion Week
 Cologne Fashion Week
 Krefeld Street Fashion Show (largest street fashion show in the world)
 Munich Fashion Week
 Schwerin LOOK
 Stuttgart Fashion Week
 Warnemünde Fashion Week (Rostock)

Greece 
 Athens Xclusive Designers Week

Hungary 
 Budapest Fashion Week

Italy 

 Bari Fashion Week
 Benevento Fashion Week
 Benevento In Moda
 Bologne Fashion Week
 Catania Fashion Week
 Cesena Fashion Week
 Cortina Fashion Week
 Firenze Fashion Week
 Genova Fashion Week

 Milan Fashion Week (capital)
 Fall 2008 fashion weeks
 Napoli Fashion Week
 Pitti Immagine
 Reggio Calabria Fashion Week
 Rimini Fashion Week
 Roma Fashion Week
 Salerno Fashion Week
 Torino Fashion Week
 Trieste Fashion Week
 Venezia Fashion Week
 Verona Fashion Week

Latvia 
 Riga Fashion Week

Lithuania 
 Mados infekcija

Luxembourg 
 Luxembourg Fashion Week

Malta 
 Mercedes Benz Malta Fashion Week

Monaco 
 Montecarlo Fashion Week (Fashion Fair Week)

Netherlands 
 Amsterdam Fashion Week
 Rotterdam Fashion Week
 Canal Catwalk
 Floating Fashion Week

Norway 
 Oslo Fashion Week

Poland 
 Łódź FashionPhilosophy Fashion Week Poland
 Mercedes Benz Fashion Weekend Warsaw

Portugal 
 Lisbon Fashion Week
 Portugal Fashion

Romania 
 Kasta Morrely Fashion Week Iasi
 Feeric Fashion Week
 Bucharest Fashion Week

Serbia 
 Belgrade Fashion Week
 Elite Model Look Serbia
 Belgrade Design Week
 Serbia Fashion Week

Spain
 Cibeles Madrid Fashion Week
 Barcelona Fashion Week (Pasarela Gaudí)
 Malagá Fashion Week (Plaza Mayor Week)
 Murcia Fashion Week
 Valencia Fashion Week
 Sevilla Fashion Week
 Zaragoza Fashion Week
 The Brandery

Sweden 
 Stockholm Fashion Week
 Umeå Fashion Week

United Kingdom 

 Vivz World Fashion Week
 Aberdeen Fashion Week
 Asia Fashion Week London
 Africa Fashion Week London
 Birmingham Fashion Week
 Brighton Fashion Week
 Bristol Fashion Week
 Cheltenham Fashion Week
 Clothes Show Live
 Essex Fashion Week
 Fashion in Film Festival
 Leeds Fashion Show
 Liverpool Fashion Week
 London Fashion Week (capital)
 Fall 2008 fashion weeks
 Men's Fashion Week
 Manchester Fashion Week
 Oxford Fashion Week
 Pure London
 Strut
 Sunrise in Baku Fashion Project
 Vivz World Fashion Week

Ukraine
 Ukrainian Fashion Week
 Odesa Fashion Week

Oceania

Australia 
 Australian Fashion Week
 Melbourne Fashion Festival
 Melbourne Spring Fashion Week
 Mercedes-Benz Fashion Festival Brisbane
 Adelaide Fashion Festival
 Telstra Perth Fashion Festival

Fiji 
 Fiji Fashion Week

New Zealand 
 New Zealand Fashion Week

See also 
 Fashion week
 List of fashion designers

Notes

Events
Fashion